= American Chamber of Commerce in Libya =

- Founded: 2011
- Type: Advocacy group
- Location(s): Tripoli, Libya and Washington, D.C.
- Region served: United States industry
- Method: Media attention, direct-appeal campaigns Political lobbying
- Key people: Richard H. Griffiths, Executive Director Mossab O. Basir, Executive Director (2011-2014)
- Website: amchamlibya.org

The American Chamber of Commerce in Libya (AmCham Libya) attracts US companies to the Libyan market by creating an environment for business matchmaking.

AmCham Libya’s goal is to represent American business interests. In the course of its lobbying activity, AmCham Libya regularly liaises with high-ranking members of the Libyan government and has established close working relationships with Libyan officials.

== Member of the United States Chamber of Commerce ==
The United States Chamber of Commerce is an American lobbying group whose aim is to represent American business interest around the world. In line with the traditions of such chambers, the USCC operates as an independent, non-governmental body. As one of the world’s largest business advocacy organizations, USCC currently has 115 affiliated members (AmChams) in 102 countries. The United States Chamber of Commerce does not recognize the organization, as per its official international directory.

The Libyan member organization was established in 2011, shortly after the end of the revolution that led to the overthrow of Muammar Gaddafi's regime. According to a statement published by the USCC, the organization views "the establishment of the AmCham Libya as a major show of support from the U.S. private sector for the political and economic aspirations of the people of Libya" and believes that its newly established subsidiary has the potential of "delivering real economic benefits to U.S. and Libyan companies and the region as a whole".

== Organization ==
Despite its formal independence, AmCham Libya works closely together with the agencies of the American government, in particular with the United States Department of Commerce and the local United States Embassy. As the organization strives for the improvement of United States-Libya bilateral trade relations, its staff is divided between AmCham’s offices in Tripoli and Washington.

The organization’s executive staff consists of:

- Richard H. Griffiths: Executive Director of AmCham Libya. Griffiths resides and carries out his tasks in Tripoli. During his career Griffiths acquired extensive experience as an international advisor and business advocate. Before assuming the role of AmCham Libya’s Executive Director, Griffiths had worked with several other AmChams around the world in countries such as Guatemala and Colombia.
- Lionel Johnson: Washington, D.C.
- Ann Bacher: Ex officio member, Senior Foreign Commercial Service Officer for North Africa.
- Nate Mason: Senior Advisor.
- Brian Feser and Anand E. Stanley: Corporate Advisors.
